Francois Wise (born May 15, 1958) is a retired American basketball player. He played four years for the varsity 49ers at Long Beach State in California. He was picked by the Washington Bullets on the fourth round of the 1980 NBA Draft and was the 81st selection overall.  Wise survived the Bullets rookie tryout and made the club's final 22-man roster. He was waived two weeks before the campaign started.

Wise performed in several summer leagues prior to reporting at the Bullets tryouts camp. He was listed in the 13-man lineup of coach Nate Lewis in the eight team San Francisco summer pro basketball league competitions held at Potrero Recreational Center from June 23-August 14, 1980. Wise also played for the Lakers quintet in the Joe Weakley's Run, Shoot and Dunk recreational league that summer and performed in the league's all-star game, joining such stars as Larry Pounds, Kenny Tyler, Bulls rookie James Wilkes, Reggie Theus, Freeman Williams and Michael Cooper. His elder brother is Willie Wise, who played seven years in the defunct American Basketball Association and two seasons in the NBA.

He had overseas stints, mostly playing in the Philippines for the Philippine Basketball Association from 1981-1983, and again in 1985 and 1987. He also played in Mexico and also for the Detroit Spirits in the Continental Basketball Association. Wise joined the U/Tex Wranglers in 1981 upon the invitation of the team's coach Glenn McDonald. Wise later played for the Tanduay franchise and scored 74 points in a game on 10 August 1983. He also played for the Manila Beer and Hills Bros franchises. In a 118 game PBA career over five years, Wise averaged 36.7 points, 15.0 rebounds and 5.0 assists. 

After his playing years, Wise spent 33 years as a police officer with the Los Angeles Police Department before retiring in February 2020. His son, Eric, also played as a PBA import for Barako Bull in the 2014 season.

References

External links
1980 NBA Draft @basketball-reference.com 
Wise makes 'em pay 

1958 births
Living people
Alaska Aces (PBA) players
American expatriate basketball people in the Philippines
American men's basketball players
Basketball players from San Francisco
Detroit Spirits players
Long Beach State Beach men's basketball players
Manila Beer Brewmasters players
Power forwards (basketball)
Tanduay Rhum Masters players
U/Tex Wranglers players
Washington Bullets draft picks
Philippine Basketball Association imports